Hyun-sook, also spelled Hyon-suk or Hyeon-sook, is a Korean feminine given name. Its meaning differs based on the hanja used to write each syllable of the name. There are 35 hanja with the reading "hyun" and 13 hanja with the reading "sook" on the South Korean government's official list of hanja which may be registered for use in given names. Hyun-sook was the sixth-most popular name for newborn girls in South Korea in 1950, falling to eighth place by 1960.

People with this name include:
Chung Hyun-sook (born 1950s), South Korean table tennis player
Han Hyun-sook (born 1970), South Korean handball player
Lee Hyeon-sook (born 1971), South Korean comics artist
Kim Hyun-sook (born 1978), South Korean actress and comedian
Ko Hyon-suk (born 1985), North Korean speed skater
Pak Hyon-suk (born 1985), North Korean weightlifter
Ri Hyon-suk (born 1989), North Korean volleyball player
Goo Hyun-sook, South Korean television writer

See also
List of Korean given names

References

Korean feminine given names